Da-hye, also spelled Da-hae, or Da-hay, Da-heh, is a Korean feminine given name. The meaning differs based on the hanja used to write each syllable of the name. There are 6 hanja with the reading  "da" and 23 hanja with the reading "hye" on the South Korean government's official list of hanja which may be used in given names.

People
People with this name include:

Jeon Da-hye (born 1983), South Korean short track speed skater
Jeong Da-hye (born 1985), South Korean actress
Lee Da-hye (Go player) (born 1985), South Korean Go player
Lee Da-hye (swimmer) (born 1987), South Korean swimmer
Heize (born Jang Da-hye, 1991), South Korean singer
 (born 1992), South Korean female association footballer

See also
List of Korean given names

References

Korean feminine given names